Acta Botanica Islandica was a scientific journal of botany published by the Icelandic Institute of Natural History in, and about, Iceland. It was established in 1972. The 15th and last issue was published in 2011. It was primarily an English language publication, but French and German language papers have been published.

History
Acta replaced the botany journal Flóra which was published between 1963 and 1968. It addressed a lack of publications in Iceland about Icelandic botany. The first editor was Hörður Kristinsson.

References

External links 
 

Botany journals
Magazines published in Iceland
1972 establishments in Iceland
Publications established in 1972
Publications disestablished in 2011
Defunct journals